This Way Up may refer to:

 This Way Up (album), an album by Chris de Burgh
 This Way Up (film), a 2008 short film
 Brian Conley: This Way Up, a 1989-1990 UK sketch comedy TV show
 This Way Up (band), a band formed by Culture Club member Roy Hay in 1987
 This Way Up (TV series), a British comedy-drama TV series

See also 
 This Way Upp, a 1976 album by Upp
 This Side Up (disambiguation)